The 2001 Copa Norte was the fifth edition of a football competition held in Brazil. Featuring 10 clubs, Amazonas and Maranhão have two vacancies; Acre, Amapá, Pará, Piauí, Rondônia and Roraima with one each.

In the finals, São Raimundo drew Paysandu 1–1 on aggregate, but won the title for having made the best campaign. São Raimundo won your third title and earn the right to play in the 2001 Copa dos Campeões.

Qualified teams

Group stage

Group A

Group B

Group C

Bracket

Finals

Tied 1–1 on aggregate. São Raimundo won for having made the best campaign.

References

Copa Norte
Copa Norte
Copa Norte